Randersacker is a market town and municipality in Lower Franconia, a part of Bavaria, Germany. With its long tradition in wine making, Randersacker is a well-known wine places of Germany. It lies in the Würzburg district, and adjoins to Würzburg boroughs Heidingsfeld, Rottenbauer, Sanderau and Frauenland and to the municipalities of Gerbrunn, Theilheim and Eibelstadt.

Geography 
Randersacker is located in the south of Würzburg. This part of the Main is called . The term refers to the course of the river, it looks similar to a triangle.
The city of Würzburg is about three miles away from the village center of Randersacker.

There are two subdistricts: Lindelbach and the main part Randersacker.

Geology 
The ground of Randersacker consists of shellbearing limestone. Until the middle of the 20th century, the region was a centre of the quarry industry. There are still residues on top of some hills. An important historic monument is the museum-quarry near Lindelbach with a well preserved crane.

History
The first written mention of a settlement on the location of Randersacker was in 779. It reports that there were some vineyards on this ground.

The first mention of Randersacker was in 1123.

Population 
1970 – 3,378
1987 – 3,507
2000 – 3,513
2009 – 3,435

Economy 
The most important industries in Randersacker are viticulture and tourism. There are about 17 winemakers and several restaurants and hotels. Weingut Schmitt’s Kinder is a member of the Verband Deutscher Prädikatsweingüter (VDP).

Traffic 
The Autobahn A3 passes Randersacker 2 kilometres south of the village centre. Also the river Main is a transport route of national importance.

Main sights 

The Balthasar Neumann Pavilion is a pavilion designed and built by the famous architect Johann Balthasar Neumann about 1750. It is his smallest building and is completely preserved. Today the pavilion serves for representation purposes, weddings etc.

The church Sankt Stephanus is one of the most beautiful romanesque churches in Franconia.

The Zehnthof is an old manor in Randersacker.

References

Würzburg (district)